Tai Tapu, previously known as Taitapu, is a small town adjacent to the Halswell River and nestled in the Port Hills, located 6 km east of the town of Lincoln and 18 km south west of Christchurch in the Canterbury region of New Zealand's South Island. State Highway 75 passes through the centre of the village, connecting Christchurch with Akaroa and the Banks Peninsula.

The Tai Tapu Hotel was established in 1856 and is located 1 km north of the town centre on a scenic country road. It has a large outdoor dining area that looks over the Halswell River with views to the Tai Tapu Golf Course.

Etymology
The name Tai Tapu is derived from the Māori words wai tapu, which means sacred or solemn water.

The village was previously known as Taitapu, until an official name change in 2009.

The village is often colloquially referred to as 'Tai Tap' by locals.

Demographics 
Tai Tapu is described by Statistics New Zealand as a rural settlement.

Tai Tapu settlement had a population of 540 at the 2018 New Zealand census, an increase of 69 people (14.6%) since the 2013 census, and an increase of 204 people (60.7%) since the 2006 census. There were 171 households. There were 276 males and 267 females, giving a sex ratio of 1.03 males per female, with 141 people (26.1%) aged under 15 years, 60 (11.1%) aged 15 to 29, 270 (50.0%) aged 30 to 64, and 66 (12.2%) aged 65 or older.

Ethnicities were 96.1% European/Pākehā, 9.4% Māori, 1.1% Pacific peoples, 0.6% Asian, and 1.1% other ethnicities (totals add to more than 100% since people could identify with multiple ethnicities).

Although some people objected to giving their religion, 60.6% had no religion, 31.7% were Christian, 0.6% were Buddhist and 1.1% had other religions.

Of those at least 15 years old, 117 (29.3%) people had a bachelor or higher degree, and 48 (12.0%) people had no formal qualifications. The employment status of those at least 15 was that 225 (56.4%) people were employed full-time, 81 (20.3%) were part-time, and 3 (0.8%) were unemployed.

Tai Tapu statistical area
Tai Tapu statistical area includes the settlement and a larger area to the east.

The statistical area had a population of 1,173 at the 2018 New Zealand census, an increase of 225 people (23.7%) since the 2013 census, and an increase of 411 people (53.9%) since the 2006 census. There were 384 households. There were 606 males and 570 females, giving a sex ratio of 1.06 males per female. The median age was 42.9 years (compared with 37.4 years nationally), with 291 people (24.8%) aged under 15 years, 147 (12.5%) aged 15 to 29, 567 (48.3%) aged 30 to 64, and 165 (14.1%) aged 65 or older.

Ethnicities were 96.9% European/Pākehā, 7.2% Māori, 0.3% Pacific peoples, 1.0% Asian, and 1.5% other ethnicities (totals add to more than 100% since people could identify with multiple ethnicities).

The proportion of people born overseas was 16.9%, compared with 27.1% nationally.

Although some people objected to giving their religion, 57.3% had no religion, 34.5% were Christian, 0.3% were Muslim, 0.3% were Buddhist and 1.3% had other religions.

Of those at least 15 years old, 276 (31.3%) people had a bachelor or higher degree, and 102 (11.6%) people had no formal qualifications. The median income was $47,500, compared with $31,800 nationally. The employment status of those at least 15 was that 474 (53.7%) people were employed full-time, 171 (19.4%) were part-time, and 15 (1.7%) were unemployed.

Education
Tai Tapu School is a full primary school catering for years 1 to 8.

References

External links

Selwyn District
Populated places in Canterbury, New Zealand